Hogi Pyaar Ki Jeet is a 1999 Indian Hindi-language action romantic drama film directed by P.Vasu starring Ajay Devgn, Neha Bajpai, Arshad Warsi and Mayuri Kango. The film was a semi-hit at the box office.

Summary

Surjit finds out that his sister is in love with Manjit Singh, the younger brother of Thakur Gajendra Singh. Surjit goes to Thakur's house in order to get Manjit to marry his sister. Thakur humiliates him; making him, a vegetarian, eat dog food and beg on his knees. Surjit does so and is told to go home and make wedding preparations. The next day, Thakur visits Surjit and kills him and his wife in broad daylight. Surjit's last dying wish is that his two sons Raju and Kishan must marry Thakur's and his brother's two daughters Meena and Preeti and they must have Thakur come begging on their doorstep for this marriage alliance. Surjit's sister agrees to this and accordingly brings up the two children. Unfortunately, Raju goes missing, leaving her alone to bring up Kishan. Years later they are reunited when Raju returns home and they join to fulfill Surjit's last wish. What they do not know is Meena and Preeti are to be married to Minister Khurana's two sons and nothing in the world is going to make Thakur change his mind.

Cast
 Ajay Devgn as Raju
 Arshad Warsi as Kishan
 Neha Bajpai as Meena Singh
 Mayuri Kango as Preeti Singh
 Prithvi as Thakur Manjit Singh
 Arjun as Arjun Singh
 Ketki Dave as Shalini
 Mohan Joshi as Thakur Gajendra Singh
 Adi Irani as Diga Diga Khurana
 Shiva Rindani as Dum Dum Khurana
 Raza Murad as Minister Jagdish Khurana
 Tiku Talsania as Truck Driver
 Anil Dhawan as Surjit
 Rajesh Puri as Pundit

Production
Ayub Khan was signed for Arshad Warsi's role but dropped out. Ayesha Jhulka and Mamta Kulkarni were signed for the roles played by Neha and Mayuri Kango but both dropped out later. Shilpa Shetty was signed for the film but replaced. The film was actually titled Kishan Balram during its production featuring Salman Khan in Ajay Devgan's role along with Aamir Khan in Arshad Warsi's role, Sonali Bendre in Neha's role and Shilpa Shetty in Mayuri Kango's role but all of them opted out due to busy schedule of their other projects.

Soundtrack
The soundtrack was composed by Anand–Milind and the lyrics written by Sameer. The song "Tere Pyaar Mein" was a hit. Planet Bollywood gave the album a rating of 8.5 out of 10.

Reception 
Suparn Verma of Rediff wrote, "Maybe, if your memory too was struck by the Chernobyl virus on April 26 and you lost all your recollection of old Hindi films, you'll certainly be charmed by the gags in this one".

References

External links

1999 films
Films scored by Anand–Milind
1990s Hindi-language films
Films directed by P. Vasu
Indian action drama films
1990s action drama films